Yeh Teraa Ghar Yeh Meraa Ghar is a 2001 Indian Hindi-language comedy film directed by Priyadarshan. This story of the film is an remake of the Malayalam language film Sanmanassullavarkku Samadhanam with a sequence borrowed from another Malayalam movie Minnaram. The film stars Suniel Shetty, Mahima Chaudhry and Paresh Rawal.

Synopsis
After the death of his dad, Dayashankar Manorilal Pandey (Sunil Shetty) arranges the marriage of his two sisters. In debt, he goes to the city to ask the tenants to leave his house, as he intends to sell it and repay his debts. A Maharashtrian woman, her two daughters, Jyoti, Saraswati (Mahima Chaudhry), and one son, Chotu (Master Aditi) are living there. When Dayashankar asks them to vacate, they refuse. What results is Dayashankar's comedic attempts to force them to vacate – from seeking legal advice; to filing police reports; asking goons to remove them, and even moving in himself.

Cast 
Sunil Shetty as Dayashankar Manoharilal Pandey
Mahima Chaudhry as Saraswati
Paresh Rawal as Inspector O. P. Yadav & childhood friend of dayashankar.
Usha Nadkarni as Saraswati's Mother
Kishore Nandlaskar as Tatya, Saraswati Neighbour 
Suhasini Mulay as O. P. Yadav's Sister
Sanjay Narvekar as Dayashankar Manoharilal Pandey's friend Babban
Neeraj Vora as Seth Haribhau (greedy man and owner of juice van.)
Saurabh Shukla as Mama Kaanden
Geetha Vijayan as Saraswati's co-worker
Anjan Srivastav as Sethji
Asrani as Chandiramani, Lawyer
Nagma Special Appearance in a song 
Ambika Ranjankar as Dayashankar Manoharilal Pandey's sister

Music

The song "Govinda" was recorded by a dubbing artist and later recorded by Alka Yagnik. For reasons unknown, the first few lines of the song are retained with the original uncredited singer's vocals.

References

External links 
 

2001 films
2000s Hindi-language films
Films scored by Anand–Milind
Films directed by Priyadarshan
Indian comedy films
Hindi remakes of Malayalam films
2001 comedy films
Hindi-language comedy films